Jamie Nicole Lilly (b. February 9, 1983 from San Diego, California United States) was a professional American "Mid School" Bicycle Motocross (BMX) racer whose prime competitive years were from 1987 to 2004. Nicknamed "Kiddo #1" at the age of 8 years, she became one of the first female professionals of the American Bicycle Association (ABA) when they for the first time created a female professional division in the sanctioning body's history in 1998 (the NBL had restarted their pro girls class in 1997 after their first attempt between 1985–1987) and became one the ABA's first number one Girl Pros.

BMX racing career milestones

Note: Professional first are on the national level unless otherwise indicated.

*In the NBL Junior Women; No comparable level exists in the ABA. 
**In the NBL it was/is Supergirls/Elite Women; in the ABA it is Pro Girls.

Career factory and major bike shop sponsors

Note: This listing only denotes the racer's primary sponsors. At any given time a racer could have numerous ever changing co-sponsors. Primary sponsorships can be verified by BMX press coverage and sponsor's advertisements at the time in question. When possible exact dates are used.

Amateur–Junior Women
Kastan Engineering: October 1989-January 1991. The ABA Fallnationals in Yorba Linda, California on October 28, 1989 (Day 1) was the first national she that raced with this sponsor. The ABA Silver Dollar National in Reno, Nevada on January 13, 1991 was the last race on Kastan.
D&M Racing: February 1991-thru mid-1991. Lilly's first race for D&M was the ABA Winternationals in Phoenix, Arizona on February 16, 1991.
Powerlite: 1991-September 1992
U.S. Boss Racing Products: September 1992 – 1993
Auburn:  January 1994-December 1995
GT (Gary Turner) Bicycles: January 1996-December 1997

Professional–Elite Women

GT Racing/Panasonic Shockwave:January 1998-Mid October 2000
System's West/Profile Racing: October 23, 2000-July 2001
System's West/Redline Bicycles: July 2001-November 2002
Free Agent/System's West: November 2002-January 2004. The 2002 ABA Grandnational was her first race with Free Agent.
Fox/Supercross: February 2004-Late 2004
Hiatus due to knee injury
Hyper Bicycles: January 2006-She attempted a comeback after suffering a knee injury and surgercal repair a year prior (see "Significant Injuries" section) -?

Three year hiatus (2006-2009): After another hiatus Her first race back was supposed to be the NBL Boulder Dam National in Boulder City, Nevada on February 25, 2009. She was unsponsored

Career bicycle motocross titles

Note: Listed are District, State/Provincial/Department, Regional, National, and International titles in italics. Only sanctioning bodies that existed during the racer's career(s) are listed. Depending on point totals of individual racers, winners of Grand Nationals do not necessarily win National titles. Series and one off Championships are also listed in block.

Amateur/Junior Women
National Bicycle League (NBL)
1996 13 Girls Grandnational Champion
1996 13 Girls National No.1
American Bicycle Association (ABA)
1989 6 & Under Girls National No.2
1990 7 Girls US Open West Champion
1990 California District 2 (CA-02) Girls No.1
1990 7 Girls Race of Champions (ROC) Champion
1990 7 Girls NAG No.1
1990 7 Girls Grandnational Champion.
1991 8 Girls NAG No.1
1991 8 Girls Grandnational Champion
1992 California District 2 (CA-02) Girls No.1
1992 California District 2 (CA-02) Girls Cruiser No.1 Only girl in that district in that division.
1992 9 Girls Grandnational Champion
1995 12 Girls Grandnational Champion
1996 13 Girls World Cup Champion
1996 13 Girls Grandnational Champion
Fédération Internationale Amateur de Cyclisme (FIAC)*
None
International Bicycle Motocross Federation (IBMXF)*
None (defunct)
Union Cycliste Internationale (UCI)*
2000 Junior Woman World Champion
2001 Junior Women Bronze Medal World Champion

*See note in professional section

Professional/Elite Women
National Bicycle League (NBL)
2000 North American International Pro Girl Champion.
2001 Super Girls Grandnational Champion
American Bicycle Association (ABA)
1998 ABA Race of Champions Pro Girl Champion.
2000 Pro Girls World Champion
2000 Pro Girls Grandnational Champion
2000 Pro Girls National No.1
2001 Pro Girls World Champion
2002 Pro Girls National No.2
2003 Pro Girls World Champion
2003 Pro Girls Grandnational Champion
2003 Pro Girls National No.1
International Bicycle Motocross Federation (IBMXF)*
None (defunct)
Fédération Internationale Amateur de Cyclisme (FIAC)*
None (FIAC did not have a strictly professional division during its existence) (defunct).
Union Cycliste Internationale (UCI)*

*Note: Beginning in 1991 the IBMXF and FIAC had been holding joint World Championship events as a transitional phase in merging which began in earnest in 1993. Beginning with the 1996 season the IBMXF and FIAC completed the merger and both ceased to exist as independent entities being integrated into the UCI. Beginning with the 1997 World Championships held in Brighton, England the UCI would officially hold and sanction BMX World Championships and with it inherited all precedents, records, streaks, etc. from both the IBMXF and FIAC.

Pro Series Championships

Notable accolades
Named no. 22 of Crig Bertlett's "gOrk's Top 90 BMXers of the 90s!!" 1999 list
She was the highest money-making girl in the sport in 1999 according to gOrk in his top 90 list.

Significant injuries
Lilly had ACL replacement surgery on her knee on January 1, 2005.

Miscellaneous and trivia
Lilly appeared in the last episode of the fourth season (1989–1990) of the television program L.A. Law when she was seven years old. That episode, "The Last Gasp", originally aired May 17, 1990.
Lilly won more pro women's races than anyone in 1999.

BMX press magazine interviews and articles
"Q&A: If you could race one race over again, which would it be?" Snap BMX Magazine December 1999 Vol.6 Iss.10 No. 38 pg. 42 Single-question interview asked of Lilly and four other professional racers including Randy Stumpfhauser, Christophe Lévêque, Neal Wood, and Michelle Cairns.

BMX magazine covers

Note: Only magazines that were in publication at the time of the racer's career(s) are listed unless specifically noted.

Minicycle/BMX Action & Super BMX:
None
Bicycle Motocross Action & Go:
None
BMX Plus!:

Ride BMX Magazine:

Snap BMX Magazine and Transworld BMX:
None
BMX World

Bicycles Today and BMX Today (the official BMX publication of the NBL under two different names):

ABA Action, American BMXer, BMXer (the official BMX publication of the ABA under three different names):

Notes

External links
 The American Bicycle Association (ABA) Website.
 The National Bicycle League (NBL) Website.
 Loopd.com page.

1983 births
Living people
American female cyclists
BMX riders
21st-century American women